Fockbek is an Amt ("collective municipality") in the district of Rendsburg-Eckernförde, in Schleswig-Holstein, Germany. The seat of the Amt is in Fockbek.

The Amt Fockbek consists of the following municipalities:

Alt Duvenstedt 
Fockbek
Nübbel 
Rickert

References

Ämter in Schleswig-Holstein